Melicope accedens is a plant in the family Rutaceae.

Description

Distribution and habitat
Melicope accedens grows naturally from the Andaman Islands to Indochina and in Peninsular Malaysia, Java and Borneo. In Malaysian Borneo its habitat is forests from sea-level to  altitude.

References

accedens
Flora of Indo-China
Flora of Peninsular Malaysia
Flora of Java
Flora of Borneo
Plants described in 1825